Christoph Hofinger (born 1967 in Innsbruck) is researcher and political consultant in Austria. Together with Günther Ogris he directs the research and consulting firm SORA (Institute for Social Research and Consulting). Hofinger studied literature, psychology and sociology in Vienna. In Austria, he regularly calculates election night forecasts for the Austrian broadcasting corporation ORF. He was President of the European Association of Political Consultants (EAPC) for the term May 2008-May 2010. In 1992, Hofinger also co-founded the Lomographic Society.

Current positions in international organizations

Teaching 
 1999 to 2000: Electoral research at the University of Innsbruck
 2002 to 2007: Social Science Methodology at the University of Vienna
 2012: Emotions in Politics and Campaigning at the University of Vienna
 2006 to present: Statistical methods, Questionnaire construction, and Presentation of research findings at SoQua (Vocational Qualification in the Social Sciences)

External links 
 
 SORA Homepage
 IAPC Homepage

Academic staff of the University of Vienna
Living people
1967 births